The Zina Solar Power Station is a 26.6 megawatts solar power plant under construction in Burkina Faso. The power station is owned and is being developed by a consortium comprising Amea Power, an independent power producer (IPP), based in the United Arab Emirates and Windiga Energy, an IPP based in Canada. The energy off-taker for this solar farm is Société Nationale d'électricité du Burkina Faso (SONABEL), the Burkinabe national electricity utility company. A 25-year power purchase agreement, governs the terms of the sale of electricity to SONABEL. Financial close for the power station was reached in May 2022.

Location

Overview
The power station's generation capacity is 26.6 megawatts. Its output is to be sold directly to the government of Burkina Faso for integration into the national electricity grid, under a 25-year power purchase agreement. The solar park will be operated and maintained by Zina Solaire, the special purpose vehicle company (SPV), created by the station developers, to design, fund, build, own, operate and maintain this power station, for the duration of the PPA. It is expected that the power station will provide electricity to 43,000 residents, and will prevent the emission of 13,200 tonnes of carbon dioxide every year.

Developers
The power station developers formed an ad hoc company to develop, own and operate this power station. They named the ad hoc company Zina Solaire. The ownership of the ad hoc company is as illustrated in the table below.

Funding and timeline

The table below outlines the sources of funding for the construction of this power station.

Construction began in May 2022. Commercial commissioning is expected in 2023.

See also

List of power stations in Burkina Faso
Pâ Solar Power Station

References

External links
 Zina solar power plant in Burkina Faso reaches financial close As of 11 May 2022.

Solar power stations in Burkina Faso
Boucle du Mouhoun Region